Rubrivivax benzoatilyticus is a bacterium that can make use of light or aromatic compounds for growth. It produces brown colonies.

The aromatic compounds that can be consumed as food for this bacteria are benzoic acid, 2-aminobenzoic acid (anthranilate), 4-aminobenzoic acid, 4-hydroxybenzoic acid, phthalate, phenylalanine, trans-cinnamate, benzamide, salicylate, cyclohexanone, cyclohexanol and cyclohexane-2-carboxylate.

References

External links
Type strain of Rubrivivax benzoatilyticus at BacDive -  the Bacterial Diversity Metadatabase

Comamonadaceae